St John Ambulance Cymru (previously known as St John Cymru-Wales, officially known as The Priory for Wales of the Most Venerable Order of the Hospital of St John of Jerusalem) is a charity (registered in England and Wales) dedicated to the teaching and practice of first aid. It is part of the Order of Saint John.

History 
The medieval Order of St John is the original inspiration of the modern Most Venerable Order of the Hospital of St John of Jerusalem. As part of its charitable work, the order founded three separate charities in the nineteenth century. One was an eye hospital in Jerusalem. The other two were the St John Ambulance Association (1877) and the St John Ambulance Brigade (1887) providing, respectively, first aid and nursing training, and first aid and nursing work by trained volunteers. The two organisations merged around a hundred years later into the single St John Ambulance organisation.

In 1907, King Edward VII, as Sovereign Head of the order, authorised the foundation of different 'priories' of the order for different nations. The first to be founded was the Priory of Wales (1918), which in turn led to St John Ambulance in Wales becoming a separate organisation and charity from the English parent body.

On 2 April 2020, St John Cymru-Wales was rebranded to St John Ambulance Cymru.

First aid cover at events 
St John Ambulance Cymru provides first aid cover at thousands of events every year. This service is provided free to patients at the point of delivery, although a charge may be made to the event organiser for provision of the service at their event.

In addition to providing volunteer first aiders for events, where necessary the organisation can provide paramedics, doctors, nurses and cycle responders, as well as mobile treatment centres, ambulances and other medical provisions.

The organisation covers many major events across Wales including the National Eisteddfod of Wales, IAAF Cardiff World Half Marathon, Principality Stadium events, Liberty Stadium events, Ironman Wales as well as smaller and charitable events such as fetes and local fairs.

Structure 
St John Ambulance Cymru is organised into seven county regions:
 Cardiff and Vale
 Dyfed
 Gwent
 Mid Glamorgan
 North Wales
 Powys
 West Glamorgan
Each county region is further sub-divided into operational divisions.

See also 
 St John Ambulance Ranks and Insignia
 Service Medal of the Order of St John

References

External links 

 
 

Wales
Ambulance services in Wales
Charities based in Wales
Youth organisations based in Wales